The 2013 World Fencing Championships were held at Budapest, Hungary from 5–12 August.

Schedule

Medal summary

Medal table

Men's events

Women's events

Participating nations
827 fencers from 101 countries competed.

  (1)
  (13)
  (18)
  (4)
  (5)
  (1)
  (13)
  (4)
  (1)
  (2)
  (23)
  (1)
  (8)
  (1)
  (24)
  (6)
  (21)
  (7)
  (11)
  (1)
  (7)
  (1)
  (15)
  (10)
  (4)
  (2)
  (10)
  (3)
  (8)
  (9)
  (26)
  (10)
  (25)
  (11)
  (14)
  (1)
  (1)
  (24)
  (Host) (25)
  (1)
  (1)
  (1)
  (9)
  (16)
  (25)
  (25)
  (17)
  (7)
  (4)
  (4)
  (2)
  (1)
  (3)
  (1)
  (1)
  (1)
  (1)
  (19)
  (2)
  (1)
  (8)
  (3)
  (1)
  (2)
  (1)
  (1)
  (5)
  (1)
  (5)
  (1)
  (2)
  (1)
  (24)
  (7)
  (1)
  (15)
  (24)
  (2)
  (8)
  (20)
  (4)
  (9)
  (3)
  (24)
  (14)
  (1)
  (5)
  (8)
  (2)
  (4)
  (1)
  (4)
  (13)
  (5)
  (1)
  (26)
  (24)
  (2)
  (8)
  (23)
  (1)

External links

 
 FIE

 
World Fencing Championships
World Fencing Championships
World Fencing Championships
International sports competitions in Budapest
2010s in Budapest
International fencing competitions hosted by Hungary
World Fencing Championships